Ziba carinata is a species of sea snail, a marine gastropod mollusk in the family Mitridae, the miters or miter snails.

Description
The species was first described by William Swainson under the name Mitra carinata. The shell is slender, fusiform and brown; the whorls have a single carinated ridge.

Distribution
The type specimen was found on the coast of Sierra Leone.

References

Mitridae
Gastropods described in 1824